In the 2011–12 Maine Black Bears women's ice hockey season they will attempt to win their first NCAA Women's Frozen Four title. Head coach Maria Lewis returns for her second season. Lewis led the Black Bears to the Hockey East Tournament in the previous season and helped the Black Bears double their win total from the previous season. The Black Bears return 14 letterwinners for the season (nine forwards, three defenders, two goaltenders). Dawn Sullivan will serve as the Black Bears captain. In the past season, she registered eight goals and nine assists for 17 points.

Offseason
Sept 20/11: The Hockey East Preseason coaches poll was released and the Black Bears were selected to finish in eighth place. The team received 18 points in the poll overall.

Recruiting

Regular season
 January 22: Maine hosted Providence College for the Sixth Annual Hockey East Skating Strides Against Breast Cancer event. The Black Bears bested the Friars in an overtime finish by a 3-2 mark. Maine improved to 13-8-6 on the season and 7-6-2 in Hockey East play. Maine goals were scored by Brianne Kilgour, Brittany Dougherty and Danielle Ward. Mary Dempsey from the Patrick Dempsey Cancer Center participated in the ceremonial puck drop. Commemorative game jerseys with pink color were auctioned off after the game. In addition, the team participated in an autograph session in which all fans received a signed team photo.
February 4–5: Maine enjoyed a series sweep versus the Vermont Catamounts. Brittany Dougherty accumulated a total of three points (two goals and an assist), while Dawn Sullivan earned an assist in the February 4 contest (a 4-1 win), and scored the game-winning goal the following day. Other skaters with notable performances included Danielle Ward scoring a goal on February 4, and earning two assists on February 5 (a 3-0 win), while Tori Pasquariello, scored two goals in the 4-1 win. Goaltender Brittany Ott made a total of 43 saves in the sweep.
Versus the Northeastern Huskies on February 11, 2012, Brittany Ott notched the 2,000th career save of her NCAA career.

Standings

Schedule

Conference record

Hockey East tournament

Awards and honors
Melissa Gagnon, Hockey East Defensive Player of the Week (Week of September 26, 2011)
Jennifer More, Hockey East Rookie of the Week (Week of September 26, 2011)
Jennifer More, Hockey East Rookie of the Week (Week of January 16. 2012)
Ashley Norum, Nominee, 2012 Hockey Humanitarian Award
Brittany Ott, Hockey East Goaltender of the Week (Week of November 28, 2011)
Brittany Ott, Hockey East Goaltender of the Week (Week of January 16. 2012)
Brittany Ott, Hockey East Co-Defensive Player of the Week (Week of January 23, 2012)
Danielle Ward, Hockey East Player of the Week (Week of September 26, 2011)
Maine Black Bears, Hockey East Team of the Week (Week of September 26, 2011)
Maine Black Bears, Hockey East Team of the Week (Week of November 28, 2011)
Maine Black Bears, Hockey East Team of the Week (Week of January 16. 2012)

References

Maine
Maine Black Bears women's ice hockey seasons
2011 in sports in Maine
2012 in sports in Maine